The 2017 FIBA Europe SuperCup Women was the 7th edition of the FIBA Europe SuperCup Women. It was held on 5 October 2017 at the Sport Concert Complex in Kursk, Russia.

Time
Times are CET (UTC+1).

Final

References

External links
 SuperCup Women

2016
2017–18 in European women's basketball
2017–18 in Turkish basketball
2017–18 in Russian basketball
International women's basketball competitions hosted by Russia
Sport in Kursk
October 2017 sports events in Europe